The Green Grid is a nonprofit, industry consortium of end-users, policy-makers, technology providers, facility architects, and utility companies collaborating to improve the resource efficiency of data centers.
At one time it had more than 175 member companies.  Membership starts at $3000, as of 2021.

As business demands increase, so does the number of data center facilities which house a rising amount of IT equipment. Data center managers run into resource limits on electrical power, cooling, and space.

History
An initial announcement in April 2006 included members Advanced Micro Devices,  Dell, Hewlett-Packard,  IBM, and Sun Microsystems.
They were soon joined by Intel and Microsoft.
By February 26, 2007, APC by Schneider Electric,  Rackable Systems, SprayCool (later part of Parker Hannifin),  and VMware had joined the effort, and a meeting in April 2007 was announced.
In March, 2011, the Green Grid proposed a new sustainability metric, Water Usage Effectiveness (WUE), which attempts to take into account the amount of water used by data centers in their cooling systems

In April 2019, The Green Grid became an affiliate member of the Information Technology Industry Council.

Participants
In 2015, the Board of Directors had the following members:
 Cisco Systems
 Dell
 Digital Realty
 EMC
 Emerson Network Power
 Hewlett-Packard
 IBM
 Intel
 Schneider Electric
 Siemens

In 2007, the Board of Directors had the following members:
 AMD
 APC
 Dell
 EMC
 Emerson Network Power
 HP
 IBM
 Intel
 Microsoft
 Oracle
 Symantec

See also
 Green computing

References

External links
 The Green Grid - official website
 

Nature conservation organizations based in the United States
Renewable energy organizations based in the United States
Information technology organizations
Organizations established in 2007
Computers and the environment
International organizations based in the United States
Organizations based in Oregon